Stuart Parkinson (31 May 1929 – 25 October 1989) was a British alpine skier and bobsledder. A former lieutenant in the Royal Engineers and 21 Special Air Service reservist, he competed in the men's downhill at the 1948 Winter Olympics and in the two-man and four-man bobsleigh events at the 1956 Winter Olympics. Parkinson was the flag bearer for Great Britain at Cortina in the 1956 Olympics. Along with his 1956 Olympic partner Christopher Williams, Parkinson won the first ever Commonwealth Winter Games 2-man bob title in 1958, representing England.

References

External links
 

1929 births
1989 deaths
British male alpine skiers
Royal Engineers
Special Air Service
British male bobsledders
Olympic alpine skiers of Great Britain
Olympic bobsledders of Great Britain
Alpine skiers at the 1948 Winter Olympics
Bobsledders at the 1956 Winter Olympics
Sportspeople from London